Kulasekharapatnam is a town in the Thoothukudi district (formerly Tuticorin district) of Tamil Nadu, India. 

Kulasekharapatnam was an ancient port dating to the 1st centuries AD and was contemporaneous to the existence of Kollam, Cheran, and Pandyan port. Kollam served the Pandyas on the west coast while Kulasekharapatnam served them on the east coast connecting them to Ceylon and the pearl fisheries in the Gulf of Mannar facing the Tirunelveli Coast. The other ports on the Coromandel Coast were Kaveripumpattinam (Poompuhar) and Arikamedu (near Pondicherry). On the west coast, the ancient ports were Kodungallur and Barugachha (Broach) in Gujarat. Kulasekharapatnam lost its significance once Tuticorin became a big port.  

Kulasekharapatnam the name is derived from pandyan ruler Maravarman Kulasekara Pandyan I. Kulasekharapatnam is referred to in Marco Polo's travel diaries dating to 1250 AD. 

Kulasekharapatnam has Muslim settlements since ancient times. 

The famous Mutharamman Temple, which is 300 years old, is located in this place. Also, at the north of this village, an ancient marvelous Temple of Dharmasamvardhini is situated.Kulasekharapatnam is world famous for dashra ( Dussehra ) Festival . 

A sugar factory was running very successfully till the end of the British rule. Since the British rule, Kulasekharapatnam has customs office. British Railway Line was established and it was called Kulasekharapatnam Light Railway and the stations were Kulasekharapatnam Central, Kulasekharapatnam Port, and KPM Sugar factory in 1933.

ISRO has announced that a new space launch pad will be set up at Kulasekharapatnam

Old Harbour mentioned by Marco Polo 
Marco Polo describes the Pandyan port city of Kulasekharapatnam which even now we can see in the seashore of Kulasekharapatnam that Some Pillars which were used to give the right direction for ships as it is at this city that all the ships touch that come from the west, as from Hormos and from Kis and from Aden, and all Arabia, laden with horses and with other things for sale. And this brings a great concourse of people from the country round about, and so there is great business done in this city.

Rowther & Marakkars settlement
Now Kulasekarapatnam has Muslim Population known as Marakkars or Marakkayars they were doing trade with Ships, they had come from Kerala, it is said Kunjali Marakkar's family members coming from kerala. In Kulsekarapatnam till 1965 the small ships "Dhoni" operated from there. If one town was a port, it must have had a Light House. Kulasekharapatnam even now has a light house in near Manapad. In Kulasekharapatnam, during the reign of the Pandyas, the city was also known as the Rowther Palayam, a section of Muslim that has military cavalry, traditional people, and horse traders. Kulasekharapatnam was also an important trade centre even before the arrival of Islam. Since the 8th century AD, this city was inhabited by Hindus.

Origin of Marakkars 
Maraicar or Maraicayar, Marakayar, Maraicar is a distinctive Tamil and Malayalam-speaking Muslim people of the states of Tamil Nadu and Kerala in India. The name Marakkar is different from Marakkayar (Marikkar & Maricar are other spellings used in history books). According to many other historians, Moppila or Moplah is Maha Pillai (great son) and Marakkar means (Marakkalam is a wooden boat) ‘boatmen’. Thurston in his Tribes of South India, states the following - The word Marakkar is usually derived from the Tamil 'marakalam', a boat.

Was it also a titular name for seaborne traders? KVK Iyer clarifies in his history of Kerala that Marakkar was a prized title given by the Zamorin of Calicut. Derived from Marakka Rayar, it signifies the captain of a ship Rayar (Captain) of Marakkalam (ship).

Traditionally, the Maricars engaged in mercantile commerce. They can be found along coastal areas of the states of Kerala and Tamil Nadu in India. 

The Maraicars can be found in coastal areas of South India, including Kerala and Tamil Nadu.

References

External links

 https://web.archive.org/web/20111015080841/http://indianmuslims.in/kunjali-marakkar/
 Kudi Maraikayar of eastern Sri Lanka

Villages in Thoothukudi district